, also credited as Katsumi Yanagijima, is a Japanese cinematographer.

Career

Yanagishima has worked with Takeshi Kitano in many of his films, including A Scene at the Sea, Sonatine, Zatoichi, Kids Return, Kikujiro and Dolls. He won the Japan Academy Prize for best cinematography for Go! in 2002  and for Zatoichi in 2004. Battle Royale and The Grudge 2 are some of his other known films.

Filmography
 A Scene at the Sea (1991)
 Sonatine (1993)
 Kids Return (1996)
 Kikujiro (1999)
 Battle Royale (2000)
 Go (2001)
 Dolls (2002)
 Zatoichi (2003)
 The Grudge 2 (2006)
 Outrage (2010)
 Like Someone in Love (2012)
 Outrage Beyond (2012)

References

External links

Japanese cinematographers
Living people
Year of birth missing (living people)